This is a comparison of digital video recorder (DVR), also known as personal video recorder (PVR), software packages. Note: this is may be considered a comparison of DVB software, not all listed packages have recording capabilities.

General information 
Basic general information for popular DVR software packages - not all actually record.

Features 
Information about what common and prominent DVR features are implemented natively (without third-party add-ons unless stated otherwise):

Video format support
Information about what video codecs are implemented natively (without third-party add-ons) in the PVRs.

Information about what video codecs are implemented natively (without third-party add-ons) in the PVRs.

Network support 
Each features is in context of computer-to-computer interaction.
All features must be available after the default install otherwise the feature needs a footnote.

1 Yes with registry change
2 Yes with retail third-party plugin
3 Yes with free supported third-party plugin
4 Yes with free unsupported third-party plugin
5 Yes with free third-party software Web Guide 4
6 Yes with add-on software called DVBLink Server
7 Yes with using symlinks, or just adding folders in settings

TV tuner hardware 

TV gateway network tuner TV servers
DVRs require TV tuner cards to receive signals.  Many DVRs, as seen above, can use multiple tuners.

HdHomerun has CableCARD Models (HDHomeRun Prime)  and OTA Models (HDHomeRun Connect) that are networked TV Tuners

See also 
 List of free television software
 Comparison of video player software
 Home cinema
 Home theater PC (HTPC)
 Digital video recorder
 Hard disk recorder
 DVD recorder
 Quiet PC
 Media server

Notes

External links 
 FLOSS Media Centers Comparison Chart



PVR software packages
 
 
Television technology
Television time shifting technology